The State Centre for Football (currently known as ServiceFM Stadium due to sponsorship from Adelaide-based company ServiceFM) is a soccer facility in Gepps Cross, an inner northern suburb of Adelaide, South Australia.

The facility consists of two artificial pitches, and the main pitch, which has a seated capacity of 1,000, and a total capacity of 7,000. The stadium hosts many South Australian NPL games and Australia Cup games. The ground is currently utilised by Adelaide United's Womens and Youth teams, and Adelaide Comets.

History
The State Centre for Football first broke ground in February 2021, two years after plans were initially revealed. The project was backed by the state and federal Labor government, after a AUD$19 million grant and AUD$7.4 million grant from them respectively.

The State Center for Football was completed in mid-April 2022, with the first competitive game being held on the 23rd of that month, a game between Adelaide Comets and FK Beograd, which resulted in the home team winning 2–1.

Australia Cup
The State Center of Football has hosted multiple Australia Cup fixtures. The stadium's all-time attendance record of 3,327 was set during the Round of 16 match between Adelaide City and Adelaide United, the first competitive meeting between the two teams.

References

External links 

 State Centre for Football at Austadiums

Soccer venues in South Australia
Sports venues in South Australia
Sport in Adelaide
Buildings and structures in Adelaide
Sports complexes in Australia